The Haunted Fort is Volume 44 in the original The Hardy Boys Mystery Stories published by Grosset & Dunlap.

This book was written for the Stratemeyer Syndicate by David Grambs in 1965.

Plot summary
A long-distance telephone call from Chet Morton's uncle summons Frank and Joe Hardy and their staunch pal Chet to a summer art school, located near old Fort Senandaga which is reputed to be inhabited by a ghost. The young detectives' assignment: recover two famous oil paintings stolen from the valuable Prisoner-Painter collection owned by Jefferson Davenport.

Mr. Davenport, millionaire sponsor of Millwood Art School, reveals that one of the famous Fort Senandaga pictures painted by his ancestor, General Jason Davenport, contains a clue to the hiding place of a priceless chain of gold.

Vicious threats and deadly traps beset Frank, Joe, and Chet as they search for clues to the stolen paintings and the gold treasure—a search that is complicated by a stormy feud between a proud Englishman and an equally proud Frenchman over the military history of the fort.

References

The Hardy Boys books
1965 American novels
1965 children's books
Novels about artists
Grosset & Dunlap books